The second season of the American television series The Masked Singer premiered on Fox on September 25, 2019, following a "special sneak peek" aired on September 15, and concluded on December 18, 2019. The season was won by actor/comedian Wayne Brady as "Fox", with singer Chris Daughtry finishing second as "Rottweiler", and singer/talk show host Adrienne Bailon placing third as "Flamingo".

Production
For the season, which featured 16 new costumes, Toybina says her goals were to increase the production quality, emphasize their backstories and increase their mobility. Tree was experimental; Toybina and her team challenged themselves to question "what fabric can do" by creating something new and different. Meanwhile, Fox was steampunk-inspired and the Penguin's mask was chromed in silver. Ice Cream was also innovative; the costume was formed during a complicated process of sculpting the head "out of foam and [waxing it] onto the shoulder." As opposed to stereotypical black and red accents, Toybina wanted to create a sleek costume for Black Widow by experimenting with texture and movement for its design. Similarly, rather than designing the expected appearance of a Leopard, Toybina relegated animal print to the costume's mask only and instead created a vintage look with a Victorian dress and large collar. Toybina says she wanted to push the boundaries of costume design by creating a "theatrical environment" made of petals surrounding the face mask of the Flower. In order to confuse viewers, the celebrity inside the Flamingo saw out of a peephole in the neck instead of the head to hide their true height. 

Movie and cultural influences were also present in the season; the hippie-like Eagle embodied Americana and was influenced by rock musicians Jimi Hendrix and Bruce Springsteen, while Skeleton was heavily inspired by the character Jack Skellington of Tim Burton's 1993 film The Nightmare Before Christmas. The Panda was imagined as a playful costume that would appeal to younger viewers of the show as the necklace was inspired by gumball machines and the clothing Harajuku-like. The Egg costume, which was requested by a contestant, was described as "somewhere between the runway and Lady Gaga." It incorporated egg features in four different ways: the costume's mask was a boiled egg, the hat was a fried egg, the intricacy of the breastplate (which was hand-beaded) represented a Fabergé egg, and the overcoat resembled a cracked eggshell. Toybina inserted the beads and stones into the Butterfly costume by hand, which she says transforms the costume's darkness and sex appeal into beauty onstage. 

Increasing the mobility of the celebrities inside the costumes was also a focus of the season's designs, Toybina said. For safety purposes, she had to reduce the extravagance of Ladybug's face mask to make it tight to the face and instead accentuated the volume of the body of the costume. Alternatively, the mask is the main feature of the street-inspired Rottweiler costume to allow the celebrity to move freely onstage. One of the last costumes that was created for the season was Thingamajig, which Toybina says resembles a grandfather and an elf with its long bead and ears. Contrary to popular belief, Toybina insists the costume was not made to resemble asparagus, rather, it was born out of pure creativity.

Filming occurred from July 1 to August 9, 2019. Toybina won a Costume Designers Guild Award in the Excellence in Variety, Reality-Competition, Live Television category in recognition of her work on the finale.

Panelists and host

Singer-songwriter Robin Thicke, television personality Jenny McCarthy Wahlberg, actor and comedian Ken Jeong, and recording artist Nicole Scherzinger returned as panelists. Nick Cannon once again returned as host.

Anthony Anderson was a guest panelist in the sixth episode, Triumph the Insult Comic Dog (Robert Smigel) was a guest panelist in the seventh episode, Joel McHale returned as a guest panelist in the eighth and ninth episodes, and season one winner T-Pain returned to the show as a guest panelist in the tenth episode.

Contestants
The competitors were said to have achieved 140 films,  69 Emmy Award nominations, 42 Grammy Award nominations, 31 Billboard #1 singles, 22 Broadway shows, 20 platinum records, 19 Emmys wins, 15 marriages, eight divorces, seven Super Bowl appearances, six multi-platinum records, five Hall of Fame honors, three New York Times Best Sellers, and two Time 100 honors.

The Season 2 winner, Wayne Brady, had been asked to be on the first season of the show, but turned it down at the time. He said he felt viewers would tune in "not because they want to see the talent, but because they want to see the train wreck." After he saw the success of the first season and getting approval from his daughter and ex-wife, he joined in for the second season.

Episodes

Week 1 (September 25)

Week 2 (October 2)

Week 3 (October 9)

Week 4 (October 16)

Week 5 (November 6)

Week 6 (November 13)

Week 7 (November 20)

Week 8 (December 4)

Week 9 (December 10 and 11)

Week 10 (December 18) – Finale

Ratings
The premiere received a lower 18–49 rating than the first season's but was similar to its average. The ratings for the finale also dropped, though the broadcast was up almost 20percent in viewers from the previous week's episode. Deadline Hollywood cited the second season as a major reason why Fox—for the first time in the network's history—ranked number one in fall entertainment programming, and Adweek named the show the "Hottest Reality/Competition Series" of 2019.

References

2019 American television seasons
The Masked Singer (American TV series)